is a railway station on the Tōhoku Main Line in the village of Izumizaki, Fukushima Prefecture, Japan, operated by East Japan Railway Company (JR East).

Lines
Izumizaki Station is served by the Tōhoku Main Line, and is located 197.4 rail kilometers from the official starting point of the line at Tokyo Station.

Station layout
The station has two opposed side platforms connected to the station building by a footbridge. The station is unattended.

Platforms

History
Izumizaki Station opened on February 25, 1896. The station was absorbed into the JR East network upon the privatization of the Japanese National Railways (JNR) on April 1, 1987.

Surrounding area
Izumizaki Village Hall
Izumizaki Post Office
Izumizaki Hospital

See also
 List of Railway Stations in Japan

External links

  

Stations of East Japan Railway Company
Railway stations in Fukushima Prefecture
Tōhoku Main Line
Railway stations in Japan opened in 1896
Izumizaki, Fukushima